Újpest is a district of Budapest, Hungary.

Újpest may also refer to:

Újpest FC, a football team based in Újpest
Újpesti TE, a Hungarian sports society in Újpest

See also
 Újpest–Központ (Budapest Metro)